Slaidburn is a civil parish in Ribble Valley, Lancashire, England.  It contains 50 listed buildings that are recorded in the National Heritage List for England.  Of these, one is listed at Grade I, the highest of the three grades, two are at Grade II*, the middle grade, and the others are at Grade II, the lowest grade.  The parish contains the village of Slaidburn and surrounding countryside.  Most of the listed buildings are houses and associated structures, or farmhouses and farm buildings, many of which are within the village.  The other listed buildings include a church and structures in the churchyard, two cross bases, a public house, three bridges, a youth hostel, a guidepost, and a war memorial.

Key

Buildings

Notes and references

Notes

Citations

Sources

Lists of listed buildings in Lancashire
Buildings and structures in Ribble Valley